The Perfidious Brother is a 1716 tragedy by the British writer Lewis Theobald. A dispute rose of the authorship of the play when a watchmaker and aspiring playwright Henry Meystayer claimed that Theobald had stolen it from him. Meystayer published his own version of the play presenting it as the work of the "original author". Theobald was later to be involved in a much more controversial dispute in 1727 when he presented Double Falsehood as being based on a lost work of William Shakespeare.

The original Lincoln's Inn Fields cast included John Corey as Gonsalvo, Theophilus Keene as Sebastian, Thomas Smith as Roderick, John Leigh as Beaufort, Jane Rogers as Luciana and Jane Bullock as Selinda.

References

Bibliography
 Burling, William J. A Checklist of New Plays and Entertainments on the London Stage, 1700-1737. Fairleigh Dickinson Univ Press, 1992.
 Carnegie, Davis & Taylor, Gary. The Quest for Cardenio: Shakespeare, Fletcher, Cervantes, and the Lost Play. OUP Oxford, 2012.

1716 plays
Plays by Lewis Theobald
West End plays
Tragedy plays